The lyretail hogfish (Bodianus anthioides), also known as the lyretail pigfish, is a species of wrasse from the genus Bodianus. The fish can be found in the Indo-Pacific from the Red Sea to Tuamotu. The adults occur along the seaward edges of reefs and in Micronesia are commonest below  in depth. They are solitary fish, forming pairs for spawning. The juvelines mimic cleaner fish. The species' diet includes echinoderms, mollusks, crustaceans, and small fish.

References

External links
 

Bodianus
Taxa named by Edward Turner Bennett
Fish described in 1832